Parectopa capnias is a moth of the family Gracillariidae. It is known from India (Maharashtra) and Sri Lanka.

The larvae feed on Ixora parviflora. They probably mine the leaves of their host plant.

References

Gracillariinae
Moths of Asia